Senator Hale may refer to:

Members of the United States Senate
Eugene Hale (1836–1918), U.S. Senator from Maine from 1881 to 1911
Frederick Hale (U.S. senator) (1874–1963), U.S. Senator from Maine from 1917 to 1941
John P. Hale (1806–1873), U.S. Senater from New Hampshire

United States state senate members
Albert Hale (fl. 2000s–2010s), Arizona Senate
Artemas Hale (1783–1882), Massachusetts Senate
Charles Hale (1831–1882), Massachusetts Senate
Franklin D. Hale (1854–1940), Vermont Senate
John K. Hale (New York politician) (1807–1879), New York State Senate
John K. Hale (Iowa politician) (1858–1946), Iowa Senate
Karen Hale (born 1958), Utah Senate
Matthew Hale (New York politician) (1829–1897), New York State Senate
Nathan W. Hale (1860–1941), Tennessee Senate
William Hale (New Hampshire politician) (1765–1848), New Hampshire Senate

See also
Senator Haile (disambiguation)
Senator Haley (disambiguation)